The İZBAN E22100 series, commonly nicknamed Gulf dolphin, are Electric Multiple Units that were built by Hyundai Rotem for İZBAN A.Ş. in order to increase its Egeray fleet. Each set has 3 permanently coupled cars and are used for commuter service in İzmir. The first set entered service on 30 August  2014 and the last one (40th) on 31 December 2015.

References

Turkish railways electric multiple units
İZBAN

25 kV AC multiple units
Hyundai Rotem multiple units